Sean McCarthy (1923–1990), a native of Finuge, County Kerry, Ireland, was an Irish songwriter. He was born one of 10 children, on 5 July 1923. He penned some of Ireland's favourite ballads including "Step It Out Mary", "Shanagolden", "Red Haired Mary" "In Shame Love, In Shame" and "Highland Paddy". In 1973 a collection of his songs was published in Listowel, Co. Kerry. 

"Poet, author, folklorist and traditional music aficionado" Mattie Lennon wrote a play about the life and works of Sean McCarthy entitled "And All his Songs Were Sad". It was produced by the Pantagleize Theatre Company in Fort Worth, Texas October 2010. It received a poor local review.

A festival in honour of McCarthy is held every August in his home village of Finuge, County Kerry. The festival includes ballad and story writing competitions. Finuge has one of the oldest surviving authentic thatched cottages in Ireland and this house, Sheahan's Thatched Cottage is owned by the Festival Committee.

Discography
 The Wandering Man, EMI, ISRMCD 009, 2002

References 

Irish folk musicians
Irish songwriters
1923 births
1990 deaths
Musicians from County Kerry